Hal Michael Ketchum (April 9, 1953November 23, 2020) was an American country music singer and songwriter. He released eleven studio albums from 1986 to 2014, including nine for divisions of Curb Records. Ketchum's 1991 album Past the Point of Rescue was his most commercially successful, having been certified gold by the Recording Industry Association of America. Between 1991 and 2006, Ketchum had 17 entries on the Billboard Hot Country Songs charts, including three that reached No. 2, "Small Town Saturday Night", "Past the Point of Rescue", and "Hearts Are Gonna Roll". Ketchum's music is defined by his songwriting and folk music influences. Ketchum retired from the music business in 2019 following a diagnosis of dementia.

Career

Early life
Hal Michael Ketchum was born on April 9, 1953 in Greenwich, New York. At the age of 15, he began performing in clubs as a drummer with a rhythm and blues trio. In 1981, Ketchum moved to Austin, Texas, where he began to visit Gruene Hall, a small dance hall outside New Braunfels, a town about 60 miles south of Austin. This influenced him to try his hand at singing and songwriting, and by 1985 he was playing at small Texas clubs. Ketchum was a finalist in the Kerrville Folk Festival New Folk Singer-Songwriter Contest in 1985 and was named one of six winners in 1986. In 1986, Ketchum recorded 11 of his self-penned songs under his full name Hal Michael Ketchum. This album, Threadbare Alibis, was released in 1988 on the Watermelon Records label. Ketchum then moved to Nashville, Tennessee, and signed a record deal with Curb Records.

Career
In 1991, Ketchum released his Curb debut album Past the Point of Rescue. Four singles were released from the album: "Small Town Saturday Night" was first, achieving a peak of number two on the Billboard Hot Country Songs chart. After it came Ketchum's own composition "I Know Where Love Lives", which charted at number thirteen. Also peaking at number two was the title track, written by Irish musician Mick Hanly and originally a hit single in Ireland for Mary Black in 1988. The last single from the album was a rendition of The Vogues' "Five O'Clock World", which Ketchum took into top 20 of Hot Country Songs in 1992. Allen Reynolds, a producer best known for his work with Crystal Gayle, Garth Brooks and Kathy Mattea, produced the album with Jim Rooney. Among the musicians contributing to the album were Mattea, Gary Burr, and Richard Bennett, as well as Bruce Bouton, Chris Leuzinger, and Milton Sledge of Brooks' studio band The G-Men. Alanna Nash of Entertainment Weekly rated the album "A−", stating that "Literate and tuneful, Past the Point of Rescue balances poetic love songs with a squint-eyed look at teenage rebellion, romance, and psychological intrigue, all delivered with a tenor that throbs with passion and conviction." Past the Point of Rescue was certified gold by the Recording Industry Association of America for U.S. shipments of 500,000 copies.

He released the album Sure Love in 1992. The album's title track charted at number three on Hot Country Songs, followed by "Hearts Are Gonna Roll" also at number two and "Mama Knows the Highway" at number eight, while the last single "Someplace Far Away (Careful What You're Dreaming)" was less successful on the charts.

In 1994, Ketchum released the album Every Little Word. Five singles were issued from the album. Ketchum wrote the first two singles, "(Tonight We Just Might) Fall in Love Again" and "That's What I Get for Losin' You", with former NRBQ member Al Anderson. These peaked at numbers 20 and 22 on Hot Country Songs in 1994, respectively. After it came Ketchum's last top-ten hit "Stay Forever", which he wrote with Benmont Tench; the title track and its B-side, "Trail of Tears", both fell short of the top 40. Ketchum was also inducted as the 71st Member of the Grand Ole Opry in 1994.

Two years later came a greatest-hits package titled The Hits. This album included the non-charting single "Hang In There Superman". Ketchum did not appear on the charts again until 1998, when he reached number 36 with a cover of Todd Rundgren's "I Saw the Light", from his next album, also titled I Saw the Light. Awaiting Redemption followed in 1999.

He covered "If I Never Knew You" with Shelby Lynne for The Best of Country Sing the Best of Disney. In 2001, Ketchum released Lucky Man. This album included only one charting single in the number 40 "She Is". King of Love followed in 2004 with only the number 60 "My Love Will Not Change" to its credit. One More Midnight, released only in the United Kingdom, produced a number 47 country hit in the United States with "Just This Side of Heaven (Hal-Lelujah)". He followed with his final albums Father Time in 2008, and I'm the Troubadour in 2014.

In total, Ketchum had six Billboard top 10 singles and sold five million albums. After he moved to Texas in 2010, he played in theaters and spaces including The Birchmere and Eddie's Attic. He played his last show at Gruene Hall.

Acting career
Ketchum appeared in the 1988 film Heartbreak Hotel, and also made a cameo appearance as a bank robber in the 1994 film Maverick.

Musical styles
Ron Wynn, reviewing Past the Point of Rescue for AllMusic, wrote that Ketchum "writes simple, sometimes moving songs about relationships and/or life's dilemmas, and communicates them in an attractive, unadorned vocal package" and said that his "delivery, as well as the arrangements and sensibility, lean toward easy listening pop and light folk." Also reviewing the same album, Mike Curtin of The Post-Star described Ketchum as having a "plaintive tenor voice" with comparisons to Roy Orbison and Lyle Lovett.

Personal life and death
In June 1998, Ketchum was diagnosed with a neurological disorder called acute transverse myelitis, an ailment of the spinal column, which left Ketchum without the use of the left side of his body. This forced him to relearn basic tasks, including how to walk and play the guitar.

Ketchum was also a painter and his work has been displayed at Pena Gallery in Santa Fe, New Mexico, where he had an opening in 2002. He was also a master carpenter and enjoyed building toys.

On April 14, 2019, Ketchum's wife, Andrea, announced on his Facebook page that early-onset senile dementia including Alzheimer's disease had progressed to the point that he could no longer perform. Ketchum died at his home in Fischer, Texas, due to complications of dementia, on November 23, 2020, at the age of 67.

Discography

Studio albums
 Threadbare Alibis (1988)
 Past the Point of Rescue (1991)
 Sure Love (1992)
 Every Little Word (1994)
 I Saw the Light (1998)
 Awaiting Redemption (1999)
 Lucky Man (2001)
 The King of Love (2003)
 One More Midnight (2007)
 Father Time (2008)
 I'm the Troubadour (2014)

Awards & Nominations

Nominations
Country Music Association
 1997 Vocal Event of the Year - "Long Haired Country Boy" <small>with John Berry and Charlie Daniels

References

External links
 
 Entry at 45cat.com
 

1953 births
2020 deaths
American country singer-songwriters
American male singer-songwriters
Curb Records artists
Grand Ole Opry members
Singer-songwriters from New York (state)
People from Greenwich (town), New York
People with autoimmune disease
Musicians from New Braunfels, Texas
Musicians from Austin, Texas
Country musicians from New York (state)
Neurological disease deaths in Texas
Deaths from Alzheimer's disease
20th-century American singers
20th-century American male singers
21st-century American singers
21st-century American male singers
Singer-songwriters from Texas